Concilio Cubano was a network of pro-democracy groups in Cuba which pushed for a peaceful transition to democracy. It was founded in October 1995.

The Cuban government realised the existence of Concilio Cubano in February 1996.

References

Cuban democracy movements
Cuban dissidents
Opposition to Fidel Castro
Political organizations based in Cuba